Alexandre Borges Corrêa (born 23 February 1966) is a Brazilian actor. He is known for his work in Brazilian telenovelas.

Personal life 
While filming Guerra Sem Fim (1993), Borges began a relationship with actress Júlia Lemmertz. He was married to her in 1993 and they have a son, Miguel (born 2000). They divorced in 2015.

Television 
 1993 - Guerra sem Fim.... Cacau
 1994 - Incidente em Antares.... Padre Pedro Paulo
 1995 - Engraçadinha... Seus Amores e Seus Pecados.... Luís Cláudio 
 1995 - A Próxima Vítima.... Bruno Biondi
 1996 - Quem É Você?.... Afonso
 1997 - Joana e Marcelo, Amor à Primeira Vista.... Marcelo
 1997 - Zazá.... Solano Dumont
 1998 - Torre de Babel.... Ronaldo Mendes
 1998 - Pecado Capital.... Nélio Porto Rico
 1999 - Joana e Marcelo, Amor que Fica.... Marcelo
 1999 - Mulher.... João Pedro
 2000 - A Muralha.... Dom Guilherme Shetz
 2000 - Laços de Família.... Danilo Albuquerque
 2001 - As Filhas da Mãe.... Leonardo Brandão
 2002 - Joana e Marcelo, Amor (Quase) Perfeito.... Marcelo
 2002 - O Beijo do Vampiro.... Rodrigo
 2003 - Celebridade.... Cristiano Reis
 2004 - O Pequeno Alquimista.... Aderbal
 2004 - A Diarista.... Calígua
 2005 - Belíssima.... Alberto Sabatini
 2007 - Amazônia, de Galvez a Chico Mendes.... Plácido de Castro
 2007 - Desejo Proibido.... Dr. Escobar
 2008 - Três Irmãs.... Artur Áquila
 2009 - India - A Love Story.... Raul Cadore / Humberto Cunha
 2010 - Ti Ti Ti.... Jacques Leclair / André Spina
 2012 - Avenida Brasil.... Cadinho (Carlos Eduardo de Souza Queirós)
 2013 - Além do Horizonte... Thomas
 2015 - I Love Paraisópolis... Juju (Jurandir)
 2016 - Haja Coração... Aparício Varella (Cicinho)
 2018 - Deus Salve o Rei... Rei Otávio de Cáseres
 2019 - Verão 90... Joaquim Ferreira Lima (Quinzão)

 Special series 
 1995 - A Comédia da Vida Privada, Sexo na Cabeça .... Antônio
 1995 - Você Decide, O Príncipe Desencantado 1995 - Você Decide, A Dama de Ferro 1996 - Não Fuja da Raia 1996 - Mundo VIP .... Ele Mesmo
 1998 - Você Decide, Trabalho Escravo 1998 - Mundo VIP .... Ele Mesmo
 1999 - Mundo VIP .... Ele Mesmo
 2000 - Mundo VIP .... Ele Mesmo
 2001 - Sai de Baixo, Miami ou Me Deixe .... Dênis
 2001 - Mundo VIP .... Ele Mesmo
 2002 - A Grande Família, A Escolha de Bebel 2002 - Os Normais, Uma Amizade Normal .... Marcelo
 2004 - A Diarista, Aquele da Regressão .... Calígula
 2005 - Sob Nova Direção, O Passado Mora ao Lado .... Guilherme
 2006 - Casseta & Planeta, Urgente! 2008 - Casos e Acasos, O Bombeiro, o Furto e a Foto .... Vinícius
 2008 - Essa História Dava um Filme .... Ele Mesmo
 2009 - Episódio Especial .... Ele Mesmo
 2009 - Chico e Amigos .... Augusto
 2009 - Programa Piloto .... Alvarenga
 2010 - Episódio Especial ....

 Cinema 
 1991 - Paixão Cigana 1992 - Sangue, Melodia 1993 - Estado de Espírito 1994 - Mil e Uma.... Antônio
 1996 - Tudo Cheira a Gasolina .... 
 1996 - Terra Estrangeira.... Miguel
 1997 - Mangueira - Amor à Primeira Vista.... Marcelo
 1997 - Glaura 1998 - Traição.... Marido
 1998 - Amor & Cia..... Machado
 1999 - Amor que Fica.... Marcelo
 1999 - Um Copo de Cólera 1999 - Até que a Vida nos Separe.... João
 2000 - Deus Jr. 2000 - Bossa Nova.... Acácio
 2001 - Nelson Gonçalves.... Nelson Gonçalves
 2001 - Garota do Rio 2001 - O Invasor.... Gilberto / Giba
 2002 - Joana e Marcelo, Amor (Quase) Perfeito.... Marcelo
 2002 - As Três Marias 2003 - Acquária.... Bártok
 2004 - Pato com Laranja 2005 - Nanoilusão 2006 - Balada das Duas Mocinhas de Botafogo.... Father
 2006 - Zuzu Angel.... Fraga
 2006 - Gatão de Meia Idade.... Cláudio
 2008 - Adagio Sostenuto.... José Morelli
 2008 - Plastic City....
 2011 - Retrato Falhado.... Delegado Araújo
 2014 - Mr. Peabody and Sherman.... Mr. Peabody (voice)
 2014 - Getúlio.... Carlos Lacerda
 2015 - Happily Married (Bem Casados)''.... Heitor

References

External links

1966 births
Living people
People from Santos, São Paulo
Brazilian male television actors
Brazilian male telenovela actors
Brazilian male film actors